Tomáš Medveď (born 31 December 1973) is a retired Slovak football striker.

Honours

Individual
Slovak Elite club league top scorers with 103 goals.
Hungarian League: Top scorer of the 2004-05 season

References

External links

Eurosport profile

1973 births
Living people
Slovak footballers
Association football forwards
FC VSS Košice players
FK Dukla Banská Bystrica players
FK Inter Bratislava players
FC Fastav Zlín players
ŠK Futura Humenné players
FC Lokomotíva Košice players
ŠK Slovan Bratislava players
FC Petržalka players
SSV Ulm 1846 players
Fehérvár FC players
Lombard-Pápa TFC footballers
Changsha Ginde players
Chinese Super League players
FC Senec players
Slovak Super Liga players
Expatriate footballers in the Czech Republic
Expatriate footballers in Germany
Expatriate footballers in Hungary
Expatriate footballers in China
Slovak football managers
Sportspeople from Košice